Live In São Paulo is the second live album by Brazilian heavy metal band Sepultura. All the tracks were recorded on April 3, 2005, at a concert in São Paulo, Brazil. A DVD was also filmed at the show. The performance of "Refuse/Resist" was released as the single for the album. Both were released on November 8, through SPV Records. The album and DVD are the second time that fans can hear singer Derrick Green perform Max Cavalera-era Sepultura songs on an official release. A live version of "Roots Bloody Roots" featuring Green was released as a bonus track on Nation.

Track listing

In "Biotech Is Godzilla" the band plays Led Zeppelin's song "Dazed and Confused" from their 1969 album Led Zeppelin.

 "Making Of" (11 min)
 "Band Biography" (18 min)

DVD 2
 A documentary about the band from 1998–2005
 "Mind War" (video clip)
 "Bullet the Blue Sky" (video clip)
 "Choke" (video clip)
 "Nomad" (live)
 "Desperate Cry" (live)
 "Territory" (live)

Credits
Sepultura
Derrick Green – lead vocals, rhythm guitar
Andreas Kisser – lead guitar, backing vocals
Paulo Jr. – bass
Igor Cavalera – drums, percussion

Other Performers
B-Negao – vocals ("Black Steel in the Hour of Chaos")
Alex Camargo – vocals ("Necromancer")
João Gordo – vocals ("Reza" and "Biotech is Godzilla")
Jairo Guedz – guitar ("Troops of Doom" and "Necromancer")
Zé Gonzáles – turntables ("Black Steel in the Hour of Chaos")

References 

2005 live albums
Sepultura live albums
SPV/Steamhammer live albums